The 2006 Gent–Wevelgem race was the 64th edition of the Gent–Wevelgem cycling classic. It was held on April 5, 2006, and was won by Norwegian sprinter Thor Hushovd.

General standings

05-04-2006: Gent–Wevelgem, 210km.

References

External links
Cyclingnews.com Gent-Wevelgem page

Gent–Wevelgem
2006 UCI ProTour
2006 in Belgian sport